Turtle Geometry is a college-level math text written by Hal Abelson and Andrea diSessa which aims to engage students in exploring mathematical properties visually via a simple programming language to maneuver the icon of a turtle trailing lines across a personal computer display.

See also
Turtle graphics
Turtle Geometry at MIT Press

Computer science books
1981 non-fiction books
MIT Press books